Endangered Species is the eleventh studio album by American hard rock/heavy metal band Y&T, released in 1997 through the Music for Nations label. It was the last Y&T studio album before a firm reunion occurring in 2010.

Track listing

Personnel
Dave Meniketti – vocals, guitar, producer, engineer, artwork, cover concept
Stef Burns – guitar
Phil Kennemore – bass, producer
Jimmy DeGrasso – drums, percussion
Production
Scott Boorey – producer, engineer, mixing at Rocket Lab, San Francisco, California in February 1997
Scott Boorey management – management

References

Y&T albums
1997 albums